Sylwia Kapusta-Szydłak (born 8 December 1982) is a road cyclist from Poland. She participated at the 2007, 2008, 2009 and 2011 UCI Road World Championships.

References

External links
 profile at Procyclingstats.com

1982 births
Polish female cyclists
Living people
Place of birth missing (living people)
21st-century Polish women